Richard Lauren Kagan (born 1943) is an American historian specializing in modern history. His focus of research is on the intellectual and legal history of the Spanish Empire under the Habsburgs.

Born in 1943, he holds an undergraduate degree from Columbia University and a PhD from the University of Cambridge. Kagan has been a professor at Johns Hopkins University since 1972. There, he acts as the Arthur O. Lovejoy Professor Emeritus of History, with a joint-appointment as a Professor in the Department of Romance Languages and Literatures. His work has given him international recognition. He has been invited to deliver speeches about his work in Spain and France (Universidad Autónoma de Madrid, Universidad Complutense de Madrid, Centre national de la recherche scientifique and École des hautes études en sciences sociales).

Kagans is a resident member of the American Philosophical Society He has been a corresponding member of the Real Academia de la Historia since 2012.

His work has addressed various issues regarding intellectual life in the Spanish Empire, such as art, law, the development of higher education, as well as its repercussion in North America. He is a supporter of the hypothesis of the black legend. He is a supporter to understand te Black legend.

Publications

Students and Society in Early Modern Spain (1974)234
Lawsuits and Litigants in Castile, 1500-1700 (1981)567
Lucrecia’s Dreams: Politics and Prophecy in Sixteenth-Century Spain (1990)8910111213
Urban Images of the Hispanic World, 1493-1793 (2000)1415
Spanish Cities of the Golden Age (1989)16
Spain, Europe, and the Atlantic World (1995), con Geoffrey Parker1718
Spain in America: The Origins of Hispanism in the United States (2002)
Inquisitorial Inquiries: The Brief Lives of Secret Jews and Other Heretics (2004)202122
Atlantic Diasporas: Jews, Conversos and Crypto-Jews, the Age of Mercantilism (2008), con Philip D. Morgan232425262728
Clio and the Crown: The Politics of History in Medieval and Early Modern Spain (2009), Johns Hopkins University Press2930

References

1943 births
Living people
21st-century American historians
21st-century American male writers
Johns Hopkins University faculty
Corresponding members of the Real Academia de la Historia
American male non-fiction writers
Members of the American Philosophical Society
Columbia College (New York) alumni
Alumni of the University of Cambridge